The Los Quiroga Dam (in Spanish, Dique Los Quiroga) is a dam on the course of the Dulce River, in the province of Santiago del Estero, Argentina. It is located near the provincial capital Santiago del Estero and the city of La Banda. It was finished in 1956.

It has 32 floodgates.

The dam creates a reservoir that is employed mainly for fishing and attracts tourism due to its natural environment. Near the dam lies the Los Quiroga Hydroelectric Power Plant, which was inaugurated in 1963.

References
 Government of Santiago del Estero — Official website.

External links

Dams in Argentina
Dams completed in 1956
Buildings and structures in Santiago del Estero Province